In September 2016, the International Union for Conservation of Nature (IUCN) listed 548 near threatened fish species. Of all evaluated fish species, 3.6% are listed as near threatened. 
The IUCN also lists seven fish subspecies as near threatened.

Of the subpopulations of fish evaluated by the IUCN, ten species subpopulations have been assessed as near threatened.

This is a complete list of near threatened fish species and subspecies evaluated by the IUCN. Species and subspecies which have near threatened subpopulations (or stocks) are indicated.

Cartilaginous fish
Chondrichthyes includes sharks, rays, skates, and sawfish. There are 118 species and eight subpopulations of cartilaginous fish assessed as near threatened.

Rays and skates

Ground sharks
There are 35 species and one subpopulation of ground shark assessed as near threatened.

Requiem sharks
Species

Subpopulations
Pigeye shark (Carcharhinus amboinensis) (1 subpopulation)

Houndsharks

Catsharks

Other ground shark species

Carpet sharks
Species

Subpopulations
Nurse shark (Ginglymostoma cirratum) (1 subpopulation)
Epaulette shark (Hemiscyllium ocellatum) (1 subpopulation)

Squaliformes
Species

Subpopulations
Smallfin gulper shark (Centrophorus moluccensis) (1 subpopulation)
Kitefin shark (Dalatias licha) (1 subpopulation)

Other cartilaginous fish
Species

Subpopulations

Lampreys

Ray-finned fish
There are 425 species, seven subspecies, and one subpopulation of ray-finned fish assessed as near threatened.

Silversides

Toothcarps
Species

Subspecies

Cypriniformes
Cypriniformes includes carps, minnows, loaches and relatives. There are 122 species and one subspecies in the order Cypriniformes assessed as near threatened.

Hillstream loaches

True loaches

Cyprinids
Species

Subspecies
Ot baligi (Phoxinellus zeregi meandri)

Suckers

Catfish

Perciformes
There are 140 species and one subspecies in the order Perciformes assessed as near threatened.

Cichlids
Species

Subspecies
Sarotherodon galilaeus multifasciatus

Percids

Epinephelids

Eleotrids

Gobies

Sparids

Wrasses

Other Perciformes species

Osteoglossiformes
Species

Subspecies
Marcusenius senegalensis pfaffi

Characiformes

Scorpaeniformes

Tetraodontiformes

Eels

Other ray-finned fish
Species

Subspecies
Atlantic sturgeon (Acipenser oxyrinchus oxyrinchus)
Subpopulations
Sockeye salmon (Oncorhynchus nerka) (2 subpopulations)

Hagfishes
Inshore hagfish (Eptatretus burgeri)
Nemamyxine kreffti

See also 
 Lists of IUCN Red List near threatened species
 List of least concern fishes
 List of vulnerable fishes
 List of endangered fishes
 List of critically endangered fishes
 List of recently extinct fishes
 List of data deficient fishes
 Sustainable seafood advisory lists and certification

References 

Fishes
Near threatened fishes
Near threatened fishes
Near threatened fishes